VP-6 was a Patrol Squadron of the U.S. Navy. The squadron was established as Patrol Squadron 6 (VP-6) on 29 May 1924 and removed from the records on 3 May 1926.

Operational history
29 May 1924: VP-6 was scheduled for establishment using naval station assets (two F-5L seaplanes) at NAS Hampton Roads, Virginia. Prior to the designation of patrol squadrons, each naval station had maintained a small section of flying boats and float planes. These aircraft, pilots and support personnel formed the cadre of the first true patrol squadrons in the Navy. Unfortunately, documentation does not exist to verify that this squadron was actually established. It appears to have been a paper squadron listed in the records, but never formed.
3 May 1926: VP-6 was removed from the records.

Aircraft assignments
The squadron was assigned the following aircraft, effective on the dates shown:
 F5L – 1924

Home port assignments
The squadron was assigned to these home ports, effective on the dates shown:
 NAS Hampton Roads, Virginia – Scheduled for 1924

See also

 Maritime patrol aircraft
 List of inactive United States Navy aircraft squadrons
 List of United States Navy aircraft squadrons
 List of squadrons in the Dictionary of American Naval Aviation Squadrons
 History of the United States Navy

References

Patrol squadrons of the United States Navy
Wikipedia articles incorporating text from the Dictionary of American Naval Aviation Squadrons